Silverstar may refer to:

Silverstar E-PC, a variant of the netbook Skytone Alpha-400
Silverstar (film), a 2022 Dutch film
Silver Star Mountain Resort, or SilverStar, a ski resort in British Columbia, Canada
 SS Silverstar (1951–1956), a small passenger ship retrofitted from

See also 
 Silver Star (disambiguation)